Yutaka Ashikaga (born October 15, 1968) is a former Japanese baseball player.  He pitched for the Fukuoka Daiei Hawks in the Pacific League.

References

Living people
1968 births
Baseball people from Akita Prefecture
Japanese baseball players
Fukuoka Daiei Hawks players
Mercuries Tigers players
Japanese expatriate baseball players in Taiwan